Sandy Hook is an unincorporated community and census-designated place in Washington County, Maryland, United States. Its population was 188 as of the 2010 census. Sandy Hook was briefly important as for a few years it was the end of the line for the Baltimore and Ohio Railroad, then under construction. This period ended with the opening of the B & O Railroad Potomac River Crossing in 1837. 

During John Brown's 1859 raid on Harpers Ferry, just  to the west, across the bridge, a special train that had carried soldiers was parked at Sandy Hook, and it carried the telegraph that reporters used to send out voluminous stories.  Baltimore and Ohio Railroad night watchman Patrick Higgins lived in Sandy Hook from 1853 until his death in 1915. At the time of his death he was the longest tenured employee of the Baltimore and Ohio Railroad.  Patrick has been written about extensively for his role in John Brown's Raid of 1859.

Geography

Demographics

References

Unincorporated communities in Washington County, Maryland
Unincorporated communities in Maryland
Census-designated places in Washington County, Maryland
Census-designated places in Maryland
Former Baltimore and Ohio Railroad stations